The Leontine Martyrs were a group of people who were killed after a long period of captivity in Persia. They were executed by the order of King Yazdegerd II in 455, five years after the insurrection led by Vartan Mamikonian. The group is named after Leontius of Vanand (In Armenian Սուրբ Ղևոնդ, pronounced "Surb Ghevond"), the most senior of the religious group.

Martyrs

Leontius of Vanand
A high level priest also known as St. Ghevond (in Armenian Սուրբ Ղևոնդ)

Joseph I of Armenia
Joseph I of Armenia or St. Hovsep I (in Armenian Սբ. Հովսեփ Ա Հողոցմեցի), catholicos of Armenia (437–452)

Sahak of Syunik Rshtuni
Sahak of Syunik Rshtuni (in Armenian Սահակ եպս. Ռշտունյաց) - a  bishop

Tatik of Basen
Tatik of Basen (in Armenian Բասենյաց Թաթիկ եպիսկոպոս) - a bishop

Mushegh
Mushe or Mushegh (in Armenian Մուշեղ քահանայ) - A priest

Arshen
Arshen (in Armenian Արշեն երեց) - a priest

Samuel
Samuel (in Armenian Սամուէլ քահանայ) - a priest

Plus a number of deacons

Survivors

Abraham of Arazd
Abraham of Arazd was an Armenian priest and a disciple of the Leontine martyrs. Like his teachers, he was subjected to prolonged torture, but unlike them, was eventually set free. 

He afterward left society to become a hermit, remaining one until his death in the 5th century. He is regarded as a saint by the Armenian Church, with a feast day of December 20.

Veneration
St. Ghevond the Priest and His Companions are commemorated as saints in the Armenian Apostolic Church. The day of the Feast of St. Ghevond the Priest and His Companions is July 31. It is also considered the day of the clergy in the Armenian Church and their office is celebrated on the Tuesday after the western Sexagesima, as they are regarded as the patron saints of the Armenian clergy.

References
Holweck, F. G. A Biographical Dictionary of the Saints. St. Louis, MO: B. Herder Book Co. 1924.

Year of birth missing
455 deaths
Armenian saints
Deacons
Martyred groups
Lists of saints
5th-century Christian saints
Saints of the Armenian Apostolic Church
People executed by the Sasanian Empire
Armenian people from the Sasanian Empire